Valle Nevado (Spanish language: Snowy Valley) is a ski resort located on the El Plomo foothills in the Andes Mountains, at 46 km to the east of Santiago, the capital of Chile. Founded in 1988 by French entrepreneurs, it includes housing facilities along with around 900 hectares of skiing area.

History
The construction of the site began in 1987 and was completed the following year. This French-Chilean project was inspired by similar European resorts, especially Les Arcs in France. In 2001 the resort opened the first detachable chairlift in the region, gaining a significant advantage on its competitors.

From 2008 to 2010 important building projects have been realised in order to offer more housing to the tourists. One of the biggest among these projects is the construction of two buildings named Valle de los Condores. The last year also sees the installation of additional chairlifts and a ski lift, and the opening of several new slopes.

Valle Nevado Ski Resort opened the first mountain cable car in Chile in 2013.

Geography

Climate
Summers are chilly and dry, while winters are cold and snowy.

References

External links

Ski areas and resorts in Chile